Yevhen Yeliseyev (born 6 March 1989) is a Ukrainian professional footballer.

External links
 
 
 

1989 births
Living people
Ukrainian footballers
Association football midfielders
Ukrainian expatriate footballers
Expatriate footballers in Belarus
FC Shakhtar Donetsk players
FC Shakhtar-3 Donetsk players
FC Dnipro Cherkasy players
FC Desna Chernihiv players
FC Hoverla Uzhhorod players
FC Belshina Bobruisk players
FC Arsenal Kyiv players
FC Krystal Kherson players